Jacques Coetzer (born 1968) is an alt pop artist, based in South Africa. His conceptual approach fuses traditional and new media; social engagement is a key part of his practice and his projects often invite public participation. Over a span of two decades his art has evolved from sculptural object making to an action-based approach. Much of Jacques Coetzer's art employs artistic gesture, musical performance and public intervention, which he documents with photographs and video. Recent work has explored climate change philosophy and our shared relationship with nature and the environment. Coetzer works in East Africa and the United Kingdom, with Cape Town, South Africa being his primary base.

Career

Education
Coetzer received a BA in Fine Art from University of Pretoria in 1991 and studied New Media in Groningen, The Netherlands, in 1997.

Exhibitions
 DADA South? at IZIKO South African National Gallery, Cape Town, 2010
 Spier Contemporary, Stellenbosch, 2007
 Weekend Cathedral, Peacock Visual Arts, Aberdeen, Scotland, 2010

Notable Works

Blood Fountain
Red pigment in the water of Strijdom Square, Pretoria, 29 September 1992

References

1968 births
Living people
People from Kimberley, Northern Cape
South African sculptors
University of Pretoria alumni